Undying Light is the fourth studio album by American death metal band Fallujah, released on March 15, 2019. It was the only album to feature Antonio Palermo as singer, replacing Alex Hofmann after he left the band in 2017, as well as the last to feature bassist Rob Morey. It was produced by guitarist Scott Carstairs and Mark Lewis at OHMNI Studios in Nashville, Tennessee.

Critical reception 

The album received mixed to negative reviews from critics. Metal Storm gave the album a 5.8/10, saying "It's not a bad album, it's just entirely unremarkable, which is a crying shame for a band that managed to really distinguish themselves in what can be quite a repetitive sub-genre." Metal Injection gave the album a negative review, critiquing the album's production, the simplistic songwriting and song structure compared to past releases, and Palermo's vocal performance, writing "Undying Light isn’t a mixed bag or a slight misstep. It is a genuinely bad record that even diehard fans will have difficulty sitting through."

Track listing 
All song lyrics written by Antonio Palermo and instrumentally composed by Scott Carstairs.

Personnel

Fallujah
 Antonio Palermo – vocals, programming
 Scott Carstairs – guitars
 Robert Morey – bass
 Andrew Baird – drums

Production
 Scott Carstairs – guitar, bass
 Mark Lewis – drums, vocals

Design and artwork
 Nick Keller – cover art

References 

2019 albums
Fallujah (band) albums
Nuclear Blast albums